Joseph Jankovic is Professor at the Baylor College of Medicine, Houston, Texas in the Department of Neurology. He is also the Founder and Director of the Parkinson's Disease Center and Movement Disorders Clinicat Baylor College of Medicine and holds the Distinguished Chair in Movement Disorders in the same institution.

Dr. Jankovic has been recognized as Fellow of the American Academy of Neurology, an Honorary Member of the American Neurological Association, Australian Association of Neurologists, French Neurological Society, and the International Parkinson’s Disease and Movement Disorders Society. He is also selected as a “Great Teacher” by the National Institute of Health. Dr. Jankovic has written over 1,500 original papers and chapters, and has co-authored or edited more than 60 books. Under the direction of Dr. Jankovic, the Parkinson's Disease Center and Movement Disorders Clinic  has since been recognised as a "Centre of Excellence" by the Parkinson's Foundation, Huntington Disease Society of America, Tourette Association of America, and the Wilson Disease Association.

He has been ranked #1 expert in the world in movement disorders, dyskinesias and botulinum toxins

Education
In 1973, Jankovic earned his medical degree from the University of Arizona College of Medicine. He completed his internship at Baylor College of Medicine and his neurology residency at Columbia University where he was selected to be a chief resident.

Career

Jankovic has acted as the primary investigator for multiple clinical trials. His research focuses on the aetiology, pathophysiology, and classification of numerous movement disorders, as well as on experimental treatments. Jankovic has made contributions to the categorization, characterisation, and therapy guidance of a variety of movement disorders, including Parkinson's Disease and related neurodegenerative disorders, tremors, dystonia, tics, Tourette syndrome, chorea, Huntington disease, restless legs syndrome, tardive dyskinesias, paroxysmal dyskinesias, and ataxia. His research on medications for parkinsonian disorders and hyperkinetic movement disorders, such as botulinum toxin and tetrabenazine has contributed to the approval of these treatments by the FDA.

Awards & honors

Prof. Dr. Joseph Jankovic has been honoured with many awards including the American Academy of Neurology Movement Disorders Research Award, First National Parkinson Foundation Distinguished Service Award, Huntington’s Disease Society of America Guthrie Family Humanitarian Award, Tourette Syndrome Association Lifetime Achievement Award, Dystonia Medical Research Foundation Distinguished Service Award, Texas Neurological Society Lifetime Achievement Award, Baylor College of Medicine Alumni Association Distinguished Faculty Award, Baylor College of Medicine Fulbright & Jaworski Faculty Excellence Award, Baylor College of Medicine Master Clinician Lifetime Award, The Best Doctors in America, America’s Top Doctors, Listed in US News and World Report’s "Top Doctors".

Bibliography

Publications

References

External links 

Physicians from Texas
American medical researchers
Baylor College of Medicine physicians and researchers
American neurologists
Living people
Year of birth missing (living people)